Satisfaction! is an album by organist Don Patterson recorded in 1965 and released on the Prestige label.

Reception

Allmusic awarded the album 3 stars.

Track listing 
All compositions by Don Patterson except as indicated
 "Bowl Full of Yok" - 10:13
 "Goin' to Meeting"  - 7:09
 "John Brown's Body" (Traditional) - 8:15
 "Satisfaction" - 3:25  
 "Walkin'" - 7:04

Personnel 
Don Patterson - organ
Jerry Byrd - guitar
Billy James - drums

References 

Don Patterson (organist) albums
1965 albums
Prestige Records albums
Albums produced by Cal Lampley
Albums recorded at Van Gelder Studio